Big Ass is a Thai rock band. The term may also refer to:
A slang term for one's buttocks affected by Steatopygia.
Big Ass Spider!, a 2013 horror comedy film.
Big Ass Truck, an American rock band.
"Big Ass Heart," a song featured on the Glee episode "Original Song."
"Big Ass Show," a festival hosted by American commercial radio station KXRK.
Chris Rock: Big Ass Jokes, the first HBO special by American comedian Chris Rock.
Big Ass Fans, an American company which manufactures high-volume low-speed fans.